is one of the Gotō Islands in Japan. The island is part of the town of Shin-Kamigotō in Nagasaki Prefecture.

References

Islands of Nagasaki Prefecture